Timo Pielmeier (born July 7, 1989) is a German professional ice hockey goaltender, currently an unrestricted free agent. He most recently played with ERC Ingolstadt of the Deutsche Eishockey Liga (DEL). He was a third-round selection of the San Jose Sharks in the 2007 NHL Entry Draft prior to being traded to the Anaheim Ducks.

Playing career
Pielmeier first played junior hockey in his native Germany, leading the Cologne EC Junior Sharks to the Deutsche Nachwuchs-Liga in 2006–07. He moved to North America the following season, joining the St. John's Fog Devils of the Quebec Major Junior Hockey League (QMJHL) for a season before moving to the Shawinigan Cataractes in 2008–09 where he led the team to the QMJHL final.

He has played with the German national junior team on several occasions. He first played in the 2006 IIHF World U18 Championships, and the 2007 World Junior Ice Hockey Championships. Playing in the Division 1A pool at the 2008 World Junior, Pielmeier was named the tournament's top goaltender, as Germany won the title, earning promotion back to the A pool for 2009.

Pielmeier was selected by the San Jose Sharks in the third round, 83rd overall at the 2007 NHL Entry Draft, but was traded to the Anaheim Ducks organization in 2009.  He turned professional in 2009, starting with the Bakersfield Condors of the ECHL.  He scored a goal for the Condors during the 2009–10 season, becoming the 10th goaltender in ECHL history to do so. He finished the season fifth amongst rookie goaltenders in goals against average and appeared in the 2010 ECHL All-Star Game.  Pielmeier was promoted to the Syracuse Crunch of the American Hockey League for the 2009–10 season. Pielmeier was recalled by the Ducks on January 22, 2011 . He was traded along with defenceman Kurtis Foster, on December 12, 2011, to the New Jersey Devils in exchange for defenceman Mark Fraser and forward Rod Pelley.

On February 8, 2013, whilst impressing with the Landshut Cannibals, Pielmeier was signed by ERC Ingolstadt for the 2013–14 season in the Deutsche Eishockey Liga.

International play 

He played his first game with the German men's national team in December 2013.

Pielmeier was nominated to be Team Germany's backup goalie during the 2018 Winter Olympics in Pyeongchang, South Korea. He appeared in 1 game in the tournament as Germany captured the silver medal.  He also represented Germany at the 2018 IIHF World Championship.

Career statistics

Regular season and playoffs

References

External links

1989 births
Albany Devils players
Anaheim Ducks players
Bakersfield Condors (1998–2015) players
Elmira Jackals (ECHL) players
German ice hockey goaltenders
ERC Ingolstadt players
EV Landshut players
Living people
Ice hockey players at the 2018 Winter Olympics
Medalists at the 2018 Winter Olympics
Olympic ice hockey players of Germany
Olympic medalists in ice hockey
Olympic silver medalists for Germany
San Jose Sharks draft picks
Shawinigan Cataractes players
St. John's Fog Devils players
Syracuse Crunch players
German expatriate sportspeople in the United States